The Burnhope transmitting station is a television transmitter in the north of England.

History

Construction
It was originally built by BICC for the Independent Television Authority (ITA) as its sole 405-line transmitting station service the Tyne Tees Television region.

Transmission
Test transmissions started in December 1958 approximately one month before the launch on Tyne Tees Television on 15 January 1959. It was built close to the existing BBC Band I station at Pontop Pike. This was the eighth transmitter opened by the ITA.

From the station's 750 foot mast, transmissions from Burnhope were on VHF Channel 8 at a peak vision ERP of 100 kW, successfully covering a region spanning the North Yorkshire moorlands and Teesside in the South, to the remote upper reaches of Northumberland in the North.

With the advent of UHF with its 625-lines, the adjacent Pontop Pike transmitting station carried these services to the Newcastle and County Durham area from 1967 onwards, confining Burnhope to 405-line transmission.  In due course, further main UHF transmissions were established at Bilsdale West Moor (serving North Yorkshire and Teesside) and Chatton (serving upper Northumberland).

The transmitter would later get a new lease of life with the advent of Independent Local Radio (commercial radio or ILR).  Burnhope extended its remit by providing the transmissions for the first ILR service in the North East of England – Metro Radio on 97.0 MHz (now on 97.1 MHz).

After the 405-line television service ceased in January 1985, Metro Radio was for many years, the only broadcasting duty performed by the transmitter until the early 1990s, when a new tranche of commercial radio (regional) became available.

On 1 September 1994, the transmitter started broadcasting the first new regional radio service to the North East. Launched as Century Network, it then broadcast as Real Radio (North East) and is now Heart North East. It was followed almost five years later (1 June 1999), by Galaxy North East, now Capital North East.

TV returns 
In between the launch of the first two regional services, a new television service launched in 1997. March 1997 saw the launch of Channel 5, with Burnhope, along with a number of other ITA-built transmitter stations which had not been used since the 405-line closure, broadcasting the new television service.

Channel 5's analogue transmission from Burnhope ceased upon closure of the analogue TV service in the North East of England, which took place in the final phase of the digital switchover in September 2012. Channel 5 would then only be available digitally via the Pontop Pike transmitting station.

Further radio 
Two further analogue radio services would launch using this transmitter. On 5 December 2005, Durham FM launched a low-powered service to County Durham with a third and final regional service launched on 8 January 2008 (97.5 Smooth Radio).

The transmitter is also used to carry the two local DAB signals (Bauer Digital) locally, and MXR Digital regionally.

Services available

Analogue radio

Digital radio

Analogue television

15 January 1959 – 3 January 1985

30 March 1997 – 26 September 2012

References

External links 
 http://www.thebigtower.com/live/Burnhope/Index.htm
 http://tx.mb21.co.uk/gallery/burnhope/index.php

Transmitter sites in England